Leonid Yachmenyov (21 January 1938 – 18 February 2021) was a Russian basketball coach. He served as head coach of WBC Dynamo Novosibirsk from 1976 to 2004 and headed the Soviet Union women's team from 1986 to 1988.

See also 
 List of EuroBasket Women winning head coaches

References

1938 births
2021 deaths
Russian basketball coaches
Sportspeople from Omsk Oblast
People from Omsk Oblast
Soviet women's basketball coaches
Soviet basketball coaches